Robert Anderson Cavalheiro (born 1 April 1983) is a Brazilian former footballer who played as a midfielder.

External links

1983 births
Living people
Brazilian footballers
Brazilian expatriate footballers
Calcio Padova players
Como 1907 players
Genoa C.F.C. players
Treviso F.B.C. 1993 players
A.C. Reggiana 1919 players
Venezia F.C. players
Hellas Verona F.C. players
Serie A players
Serie B players
Association football midfielders
Expatriate footballers in Italy
Sportspeople from Maranhão